The VIP Protection Unit (Abbreviation: VIPPU), otherwise known as G4 (originally Section G, Division 4) is a branch of the Hong Kong Police Force.

Introduction

The original name had been given to the unit since it is the 4th division of the former Royal Hong Kong Police Force's Special Branch.

Following the disbanding of the RHKP Special Branch in 1995, the VIP Unit was reassigned under the Security Wing of the Hong Kong Police Force after the handover in 1997.

Training
It has primary responsibility for the personal safety of HKSAR Chief Executive and his/her core family (it was Governor and his family before the Handover in 1997), high-rank government officials, VIPs and visiting dignitaries to Hong Kong, therefore the training techniques taught to all VIPPU officers include VIP protection and unarmed combat.

In addition they also undergo training in firearms, crowd control, self-defense, tactical driving, physical and tactical training, Basic Trauma Life Support and English and Putonghua fluency. They also practice simulation exercises with the PTU and the SDU.

Vehicles
Luxury bullet-proofed armoured cars are often deployed in protective missions.

Weapons

The standard issue sidearms for all VIPPU is the Glock 17 and the Glock 19 for females or officers with smaller hands while the short version of the Heckler & Koch MP5 is the standard SMG and could be deployed in multiple variants, such as the K, K-PDW and Coffer.

Apart from firearms, ASP expandable batons or a Taser are carried for less-than-lethal options to the VIPPU officers. Flashbangs and smoke grenades are also used to provide cover for escorting the VIP when being attacked by intruders.

Known involvement
The VIP Protection Unit are involved in protecting Hong Kong from any kind of disturbances, including demonstrations in the 2008 Summer Olympics in Hong Kong.

References

1972 establishments in Hong Kong
Hong Kong Police Force
Protective security units
Organizations established in 1972